Bokkeum is a category of stir-fried dishes in Korean cuisine.

Etymology 
Bokkeum is a verbal noun derived from the Korean verb bokkda, meaning "to cook food or food ingredients with little or a small amount of liquid by stir-frying over heat".

Varieties 
There are dry bokkeum varieties and wet (or moist) bokkeum varieties.

Dry 
 bokkeum-bap – fried rice
 dak-ttongjip – stir-fried chicken gizzards
 gamja-chae-bokkeum – stir-fried julienned potatoes
 japchae – stir-fried glass noodles
 myeolchi-bokkeum – stir-fried anchovies
 ojingeo-chae-bokkeum – stir-fried dried shredded squid

Wet 
 dak-galbi – stir-fried chicken
 jeyuk-bokkeum – stir-fried pork
 nakji-bokkeum – stir-fried long arm octopus
 songi-bokkeum – stir-fried matsutake
 tteok-bokki – stir-fried rice cakes
 kimchi-bokkeum – stir-fried Kimchi
soseji yachae bokk-eum(소세지야채볶음) - stir fried sausage vegetable

Gallery

See also 

 Banchan

References 

Korean words and phrases
Banchan